Bohlabela district was eliminated by the 12th amendment of the Constitution of South Africa. The area of the former district which contained the Kruger National Park is now contained within the districts of 
 Mopani
 Ehlanzeni

Former district municipalities of South Africa